Diamond Guitars is an American guitar manufacturer owned and operated by Mountain High Holdings LLC, Jason Struble, the president and CEO, along with Jeff Diamant of Diamond Amplification. Former Dean Guitars founder and owner Dean Zelinsky was a co-owner from 2008 until his departure in 2012. He left the company to form his current brand, Dean Zelinsky Private Label.

History 
Formerly known as DBZ Guitars and later DBZ Diamond, Diamond Guitars was officially formed in 2013 with their corporate headquarters located in Houston,Texas. 
The company was purchased and moved to Muncie, Indiana in August of 2018.

In 2018, Diamond brought a new artist relation director on board, Dennis "Dr. Diamond" Spencer. Under Spencer, the brand saw new artists come to the roster such as nostalgic rockers Bryan Bassett of Foghat and Wild Cherry, Charlie Huhn of Foghat, English rock band Humble Pie, as well as rock band Cold.Dan V of the closet rockers.

Guitar models 

The company has a full line of electric guitars, both import and US-made, that include the DBZ Bolero, Barchetta, Cavallo, Imperial, Royale, and Hailfire Series.

For heavy metal and hard rock, DBZ Diamond recommends their Bird of Prey, Venom and Halcyon Series. A

DBZ/Diamond have manufactured a wide range of electric and acoustic guitars as well as bass guitars; some of them are:

 DBZ Barchetta
 DBZ Bird of Prey
 DBZ Bolero
 DBZ Bolero "Croc Skin"
 DBZ Cavallo
 DBZ Cavallo "Peacemaker"
 DBZ Halcyon
 DBZ Imperial
 DBZ Imperial Aliento
 DBZ Mondial
 DBZ Royale
 DBZ Tuscan
 DBZ Venom
 DBZ Venom "Snake Skin"
 DBZ Verona

Musicians 
Artists that uses/have used Diamond guitars are:

 Zoltan Bathory of (Five Finger Death Punch).
 Virus (Big & Rich, Dope, Lords of Acid, Rock of Ages) 
 Tommy Kessler (Blondie/Rock of Ages) 
 Chris Caffery (Trans-Siberian Orchestra) 
 Lewis de Jong (Alien Weaponry) 
 Jared Mullins (Heavy Glow/Holy Roller Baby) 
 John Corabi
 Sal Costa (My Darkest Days)
 Wayne Sweeny (Saliva)
 Yuji Inoue (Girl Next Door)
 Brett Scallions (Fuel)
 Jason Krause (Kid Rock)
 Joel Kennedy (Side Step The Crow)
 Jerry Becker (Train)
 Stevie Salas (Rod Stewart Mick Jagger George Clinton)
 Dave Pino (Powerman 5000)
 Adam Zadel (SOiL)
 Mike Scaccia (Ministry)
 Olaf Paskarbeit (Dimple Minds)
 Jim Karika (Solo Artist)
 Cassandra Chiles (Giant Kitty)
 Baxter Barber (Que Fuerte)
 Casey Waldner (Giant Kitty)
 Tommy Church (Mushroomhead)  
 Andrei Bojoga (Hiraeth)

Notes

References

External links 

 

Guitar manufacturing companies of the United States
Bass guitar manufacturing companies
American companies established in 2008
American music
American companies established in 2013
Manufacturing companies in the United States by state
Music companies